The Auchonvillers Military Cemetery is a cemetery located in the Somme region of France commemorating British and Commonwealth soldiers who fought in the Battle of the Somme in World War I. The cemetery contains soldiers who died manning the Allied front line near the village of Auchonvillers.

Location 
The cemetery is located on the outskirts of Auchonvillers, which is approximately 20 kilometers south of Arras, France. The two towns are linked by the D919 road.

Establishment of the Cemetery

History 
Between the beginning of the war and mid-1915, the front was held by French troops, who started the cemetery in June 1915. From 1915 until the German retreat in February 1917, the cemetery was used by Commonwealth units including the 51st Highlanders and military hospitals, who referred to it as "Ocean Villas". The cemetery was seldom used after 1917. After the Armistice agreement ended hostilities in the Great War, 15 more graves were created for soldiers who died in the area east of the cemetery. French graves have since been moved to separate burial grounds. The cemetery was designed by Sir Reginald Blomfield and William Cowlishaw.

Statistics 

Currently, 528 Commonwealth soldiers are buried in the cemetery. 487 soldiers are identifiable, including 457 British, 8 Canadians, and 2 New Zealanders.

References 

World War I cemeteries in France
Battle of the Somme